In chemistry, a polyselenide usually refers to anions of the formula (Sen)2-, where Se is the atomic symbol for the element selenium.  Many main group and transition metals form complexes with polyselenide anions.

Preparation
Conceptually, polyselenides are derived by deprotonation polyselenanes H2Sen, but such species are rare or unstable.  Instead, analogous to the preparation of many Zintl ions, polyselenides are produced by reduction of elemental Se with alkali metals.  Such reactions can be conducted by heating a mixture of the solids or by dissolving Se metal in amine solutions of alkali metals.  Synthesis can also be conducted in high-boiling, polar, aprotic solvents such as DMF, HMPA, and NMP.   These reactions appear to proceed by initial formation of the alkali metal selenide, followed by the reaction of the latter with additional selenium:
2 Na  +  Se   →    Na2Se
Na2Se  +  n Se   →    Na2Sen+1

Once generated, alkali metal polyselenides can be converted to lipophilic salts by treatment cryptand ligands or by ion exchange with quat salts.  
 Na2Sen  +  2 R4NCl   →   (R4N)2Sen  +  2 NaCl

Structures
Salts of polyselenides have often been characterized by X-ray crystallography.   Polyselenides salts generally feature open chains, which adopt a zig-zag conformation. In rare cases, cyclic structures are observed as in Li2Se5, which features a square-planar Se center.  High resolution solid state 77Se NMR spectra of [NMe4]2Se6 show three selenium sites. Single-crystal X-ray structure determination of the two salts support the NMR data.

Reactivity

Polyselenides are prone to decomposition on exposure to air, in which case they are oxidized back to elemental selenium.
  +  2 H+  +   O2    →   n Se  +  H2O

As ligands in coordination complexs, polyselenides are generally bidentate.  Complexes of penta-, tetra-, and triselenide ligands are known.  One example is the spirocyclic [Zn(Se4)2]2-.

Further reading

See also
Polytelluride

References

Selenides